Statistics of the American Soccer League II for the 1972 season.

League standings

Playoffs

Bracket

First round

Eastern playoff

Championship final

References

American Soccer League II (RSSSF)

	

American Soccer League (1933–1983) seasons
2